Népszabadság (means "Liberty of the People") was a major Hungarian newspaper which was formerly the official press organ of the Hungarian Socialist Workers' Party during the Hungarian People's Republic.

History and profile

Népszabadság was founded on 2 November 1956 during the Hungarian Revolution as successor of Szabad Nép (meaning Free People in English) which was established in 1942 as the central organ of the dissolved Hungarian Working People's Party. Népszabadság was also the organ of the party.

At the beginning of the 1990s, following the collapse of the communist regime, the paper was privatized and the owners became Bertelsmann AG Germany (50%), the Free Press Foundation (Szabad Sajtó Alapítvány in Hungarian), a foundation of the Socialist Party (MSZP) (26%), the First Hungarian Investment Fund (16.8%), and the Editorial Staff Association (6%). In 2005, the paper was acquired by Ringier; in 2014, after the Hungarian Competition Authority prevented the merger of Ringier and Axel Springer partly because of their ownership of Népszabadság, it was sold to Vienna Capital Partners, which created a subsidy, Mediaworks Hungary Zrt., for its Hungarian media interests. MSZP sold its shares to Mediaworks in 2015.

The paper was published in broadsheet format and had its main office in Budapest. In 2004, the newspaper secured sufficient funds to build an entirely new, high-capacity, full-color printing facility for its own exclusive use, which was unusual for the Hungarian press. The expanded use of color was meant as a means to help Népszabadság'''s competitive position among daily newspapers. It had more copies circulated than all of its Hungarian competitors combined, although circulation was already in the process of decline (see below).

The paper was close to the MSZP and Alliance of Free Democrats (SZDSZ) parties and its editorials often supported, though frequently also criticized, the socialist-liberal government. Its international agenda was usually supportive of the EU's and the USA's policies, though rare criticism included U.S. President George W. Bush's "democracy export" initiative. Népszabadság followed the USA in calling certain countries rogue states or part of the axis of evil and is somewhat critical of Arab countries, both on political and human rights grounds.

Marcell Murányi was appointed as editor-in-chief in July 2014. He resigned in May 2015 after being charged with a fatal hit and run, and was replaced in August by his brother András Murányi. Murányi Marcell was eventually sentenced to a jail term suspended for two years; he continued to serve as an advisor for the Népszabadság.

The paper was suddenly closed by its owner Mediaworks on 8 October 2016. The journalists were preparing for a move to a new headquarters; on Friday they vacated their old office and were still planning a Sunday opening party in the new office; on Saturday they were told they were all suspended and not allowed to enter the building. Publication ceased and its website was disconnected. The departure of former Mediaworks CEO Balázs Rónai was announced on the same day. Mediaworks  announced that the closure was a business decision due to the paper suffering losses. The liquidation of the paper was performed by acting CEO Viktor Katona, who himself resigned (claiming health reasons) on the following Monday, making it impossible for the journalists to negotiate with anyone in charge.

The closure was considered by the political left to be the work of governing party Fidesz acting behind the scenes. Alleged meetings between prime minister Viktor Orbán and Mediaworks owner Heinrich Pecina over the transfer of Népszabadság were reported as early as June. Contrary to the owner's assertion of unprofitability, portal 'The Budapest Beacon' commented that after the previous losses, the paper turned a profit of HUF 130 million (USD 480,000) in 2015, but does not provide any source or proof for this information. Heinrich Pecina, the owner of the Mediaworks Hungary Zrt said that the decision was based merely on a financial basis: in the last few years the Népszabadság had a 5 billion Forints loss in total. He also added that he had offered to sell the Népszabadság to the Hungarian Socialist Party, but this later "had no courage to buy it".Pecina: A most hangoskodók közül senki sem akarja a Népszabadságot - Origo.hu, 2016.10.15.

 Circulation Népszabadság had the largest circulation in Hungary until 2002 when it was overtaken by Blikk, a tabloid newspaper and Metropol, a free newspaper. The circulation of Népszabadság then declined and the number of readers fell significantly in the period between 2005 and 2010. Even so, it had the highest circulation amongst political dailies (the next largest, Magyar Nemzet, had a circulation of 17,390 in the second quarter of 2016).

The following circulation numbers are based on audited data:
 1989: 460 thousand
 1991: 327 thousand
 1993: 305 thousand
 1994: 300 thousand
 1995: 285 thousand
 1998: 225 thousand
 2000: 203 thousand
 2002: 195 thousand
 2003: 172 thousand
 2009: 99,446
 2010:  70 thousand
 2011:  63 thousand
 2013:  46 thousand
 2016:  37 thousand

Scandals
In 2003, Népszabadság was subject to a high-profile scandal after the paper published a letter on the front page purportedly from Edward Teller. The letter, later proved to be a fake, appeared in Népszabadság shortly after the death of the Hungarian-born physicist and known Fidesz-sympathiser Teller, claiming to express dissatisfaction with antisemitism and anti-US sentiments in the party. The letter turned out to be written by the retired journalist László Zeley, Teller's Hungarian editor, who tried but failed to convince Teller to sign it. Népszabadság'' published the letter without verifying its authenticity, and had to retract it the following day, prompting an ethical reprimand from MÚOSZ (Association of Hungarian Journalists). The editor-in-chief resigned following the affair, and got elected to the head of the Ethical Committee of the MÚOSZ between 2004 and 2011.

Chief editors 

 October 31, 1956 – April 8, 1957: Sándor Haraszti
 1957–1961: Dezső Nemes (head of the editorial board)
 September 1961 – June 1965: Zoltán Komócsin
 1965–1970: János Gosztonyi
 1970–1974: István Sarlós
 1974–1977: István Katona
 1977–1980: Dezső Nemes
 1980–1982: Péter Várkonyi
 1982–1985: János Berecz
 1985–1989: Gábor Borbély
 1989–2004: Pál Eötvös
 2004–2011: Károly T. Vörös
 2011–2014: Levente Tóth 
 2014–2015: Marcell Murányi
 2015  : Péter N. Nagy 
 2015–2016: András Murányi

References

External links
 Népszabadság Online

1956 establishments in Hungary
2016 disestablishments in Hungary
Defunct newspapers published in Hungary
Hungarian-language newspapers
Newspapers published in Budapest
Publications established in 1956
Publications disestablished in 2016
Daily newspapers published in Hungary